Kevin Briggs (27 January 1939 – 9 April 2004) was a New Zealand cricketer. He played in two first-class matches for Otago, in 1959 and 1960 respectively. Professionally he was the secretary and manager of a golf club.

References

External links
 

1939 births
2004 deaths
New Zealand cricketers
Otago cricketers
Cricketers from Dunedin